Mwanga Kusini is an administrative ward in Kigoma-Ujiji District of Kigoma Region in Tanzania. 
In 2016 the Tanzania National Bureau of Statistics report there were 17,976 people in the ward, from 16,331 in 2012.

Villages / neighborhoods 
The ward has 10 neighborhoods and villages.

 Game
 Kilima Hewa
 Lumumba
 Msikiti
 Muhogwe
 Rusimbi
 Shaurimoyo
 Simu
 Vamia
 Yusufu

References

Wards of Kigoma Region